John T. West School, also known as Tanner's Creek School No. 4 and Barborsville School, was a historic school for African-American students located at Norfolk, Virginia. It was built in 1906, and was a two-story, Colonial Revival style brick building with a hipped roof.  In 1913, it was doubled in size with an addition to the south and connected via a two-story ell. A one-story brick cafeteria was added in 1950 and a music room about 1960.  In 1911, the building hosted the first public African-American high school classes in the city of Norfolk.  It continued holding elementary school classes until its closure in 1980. It was demolished in August 2006.

It was listed on the National Register of Historic Places in 2000 and delisted in 2006.

References

Former National Register of Historic Places in Virginia
African-American history of Virginia
School buildings on the National Register of Historic Places in Virginia
Colonial Revival architecture in Virginia
School buildings completed in 1906
Schools in Norfolk, Virginia
National Register of Historic Places in Norfolk, Virginia
1906 establishments in Virginia